Cantonmen Thana is a Thana of Dhaka district in the Division of Dhaka, Bangladesh. It includes the Army Headquarters, Naval Headquarters and the Air Force Headquarters. Cantonment Thana was formed in 1976.

Geography
It has 36540 units of household and total area 14.47 km2.

Demographics
At the 1991 Bangladesh census, Cantonment had a population of 117,464, of whom 109,817 were aged 18 or older. Males constituted 55.53% of the population, and females 44.47%. Cantonment had an average literacy rate of 68% (7+ years), against the national average of 32.4%.

See also
 Upazilas of Bangladesh
 Districts of Bangladesh
 Divisions of Bangladesh

References

Thanas of Dhaka